The term Pool of Siloam (Breikhat HaShiloah) refers to a number of rock-cut pools on the southern slope of the Wadi Hilweh, considered by some archaeologists to be the original site of Jerusalem, located outside the walls of the Old City to the southeast. The pools were fed by the waters of the Gihon Spring, carried there by the Siloam Tunnel.

The Lower Pool or "Old Pool" was historically known as Birket el Hamra, literally "the red pool".

History

During the Second Temple period, the Pool of Siloam was centrally located in the Jerusalem suburb of Acra, also known as the Lower City.
According to the Jerusalem Talmud (Hagigah), the Pool of Siloam was the starting point for pilgrims who made the annual pilgrimage to Jerusalem, and where they ascended by foot to the inner court of the Temple Mount to bring an offertory to the Temple Court. The Pool of Siloam (perhaps referring to the Lower Pool) was used by pilgrims for ritual purification before visiting the Temple enclosure.

Hezekiah
The Pool of Siloam was built during the reign of Hezekiah (715–687/6 BCE), to leave besieging armies without access to the spring's waters. The pool was fed by the newly constructed Siloam tunnel. An older Canaanite tunnel had been very vulnerable to attackers, so, under threat from the Assyrian king Sennacherib, Hezekiah sealed up the old outlet of the Gihon Spring and built the new underground Siloam tunnel in place of the older tunnel (Books of Chronicles).

During this period the Pool of Siloam was sometimes known as the Lower Pool (Book of Isaiah), as opposed to a more ancient Upper Pool (Books of Kings) formerly fed by the older Canannite tunnel.

Second Temple period

The pool was reconstructed no earlier than the reign of Alexander Jannaeus (103–76 BCE), although it is not clear whether this pool was in the same location as the earlier pool built by Hezekiah – if so, all traces of the earlier construction have been destroyed. The pool remained in use during the time of Jesus. According to the Gospel of John, Jesus sent "a man blind from birth" to the pool in order to complete his healing.  As a freshwater reservoir, the pool would have been a major gathering place for ancient Jews making religious pilgrimages to the city. Some scholars, influenced by Jesus commanding the blind man to wash in the pool, suggest that it was probably used as a mikvah (ritual bath). However, mikvahs are usually much smaller in size, and if the pool were a mikvah, it would be the largest ever found by a substantial margin. Yoel Elitzur has proposed that the pool was used for swimming rather than ritual immersion.

The pool was destroyed and covered after the First Jewish–Roman War in the year 70 CE. Dating was indicated by a number of coins discovered on the stones of the patio near the pool to the north, all from the days of the Great Revolt. The latest coin is dated with "4 years to the day of the Great Revolt", meaning the year 69 CE. In the years following the destruction, winter rains washed alluvium from the hills down to the valley and down the slopes of Mount Zion to the west of the pool; the pool was filled with silt layers (up to 4 m in some places) until it was covered completely.

Late Roman and Byzantine periods

Roman sources mention a Shrine of the Four Nymphs (Tetranymphon), a nymphaeum built by Hadrian during the construction of Aelia Capitolina in 135 and mentioned in Byzantine works such as the 7th-century Chronicon Paschale; other nymphaea built by Hadrian, such as that at Sagalassos, are very similar. It is unlikely that this shrine was built on the site of the Second Temple Pool of Siloam, but it may have been a precursor to the Byzantine reconstruction.

In the 5th century, a pool was constructed at the end of the Siloam Tunnel, at the behest of the Empress of the Byzantine Empire, Aelia Eudocia. This pool survives to the present day, surrounded on all sides by a high stone wall with an arched entrance to Hezekiah's Tunnel. This pool is around 70 yards from the Second Temple (or Lower) Pool of Siloam, and is significantly smaller. Until the discovery of the Second Temple pool, this pool was wrongly thought to be the one described in the New Testament and Second Temple sources.

Discovery in the 21st century

The pool was rediscovered during an excavation work for a sewer in the autumn of 2004, by Ir David Foundation workers, following a request and directions given by archaeologists Eli Shukron accompanied by Ori Orbach from the Israel Nature and Parks Authority. Archaeologists Eli Shukron and Ronny Reich (working with the Israel Antiquities Authority) uncovered stone steps, and it became obvious that these steps were likely to have been part of the Second Temple period pool. Excavations commenced and confirmed the initial supposition; the find was formally announced on August 9, 2005, and received substantial international media attention. A portion of this pool remains unexcavated, as the land above it is owned by a nearby Greek Orthodox church and is occupied by an orchard known as the King's Garden (compare ). The pool is not perfectly rectangular, but a soft trapezoid. There are three sets of five steps, two leading to a platform, before the bottom is reached, and it has been suggested that the steps were designed to accommodate various water levels. The pool is stone-lined, but underneath, there is evidence of an earlier version that was merely plastered (to help it retain water). Coins from the reign of Alexander Jannaeus were found embedded in the plaster lining of the pool, and therefore provide a secure earliest date for the pool's (re-)construction.

Earlier excavations
Archaeologists excavating the site around the Pool of Siloam in the 1880s have noted that there was a stairway of 34 rock-hewn steps to the west of the Pool of Siloam leading up from a court in front of the Pool of Siloam.

The remnants of an ancient wall dating back to the Bronze Age were unearthed near the older Pool of Siloam, known also as the "Lower Pool," and locally as Birket al-Ḥamrah, during the excavations conducted by F.J. Bliss and A.C. Dickie (1894–1897). At the "Lower Pool" of Siloam there was a weir (levee), used to raise the level of water upstream or to regulate its flow. C. Schick's research in connection with a partially rock-hewn aqueduct related to the water system of Siloam has led researchers to conclude that the Lower Pool, Birket al-Ḥamrah, received water directly from the "Fountain of the Virgin" (Gihon Spring) at some period and which Conrad places prior to the completion of the Siloam Tunnel.

See also 
 Siloam
 Stone of Claims
 Tower of Siloam

References

Further reading
 Rabbi Yitzchak Levy (2015) "The place" in the world. The Shiloach Pool  . The Zomet Institute 
 
 
 Image and text of the Siloam inscription
 . Click here for an abridged article in html or the full article in pdf format.
 Pictures of the recently rediscovered Pool of Siloam from holylandphotos.org
 
 Fuad Abu-Taa', Aliza Van Zaiden and Tsagai Asamain, Conservation of the Shiloah Pool and preparing it for the public, Israel Antiquities Authority Site – Conservation Department

Infrastructure completed in the 8th century BC
Infrastructure completed in the 7th century BC
2004 archaeological discoveries
Hebrew Bible places
Siloam
Ancient sites in Jerusalem
Classical sites in Jerusalem
City of David
Reservoirs in Jerusalem
Water and religion
Biblical geography
Hezekiah
Rock-cut architecture
Books of Chronicles
Book of Isaiah
Archaeological discoveries in the West Bank
Jewish ritual purity law
Geography of Palestine (region)